The presidential primaries of the Concertación de Partidos por la Democracia of the year 1993 was the electoral method to define the presidential candidate of such Chilean coalition, for the presidential election of 1993. In them Eduardo Frei Ruiz-Tagle, son of the ex- president Eduardo Frei Montalva and candidate for the Christian Democratic Party (PDC) faced Ricardo Lagos Escobar, candidate for the Socialist Party of Chile (PS), the Party for Democracy (PPD), the Radical Party (PR) and the Chilean Social Democracy Party.

After the May 23 election, a convention held on the 30th of that same month proclaimed Frei Ruiz-Tagle as presidential candidate for the Concertación, who in December 1993 was elected to the country's first magistracy with 57.98% One of the highest election figures of a president in the history of Chile.

Definition of candidacies 

Towards the end of 1992, pre-candidates began to appear within the Coalition of Parties for Democracy for the 1993 presidential election. It was the same government that urged the parties of the ruling party to seek a common candidate, after the good results Obtained in the municipal elections of 1992.

For the Christian Democrat Party the civil engineer Eduardo Frei Ruiz-Tagle, the son of former President Eduardo Frei Montalva, was introduced. Despite his having entered politics in 1986, his first national majority Elected senator by Santiago Oriente in 1989, in addition to being president of the PDC. Frei Ruiz-Tagle comfortably imposed himself on other names that sounded in the collective, such as Gabriel Valdés and Andrés Zaldívar, being proclaimed on December 13, 1992.

Meanwhile, within the leftist sector of the Concertación (a bloc led by the Socialist (PS) and For Democracy (PPD) parties) Ricardo Lagos, a lawyer and economist, resigned from the Ministry of Education on September 28, 1992 to present as precandidate.

The Radical Party (PR) proclaimed Senator Anselmo Sule as his presidential candidate on August 15, 1992, although he declined his nomination in favor of Lagos.

Campaign and election 

The Concertación created a commission of politicians to study the methods to nominate its presidential candidate, which was composed by Genaro Arriagada (PDC), Erich Schnake (PPD), Benjamín Teplizky (PR) and Hernán Vodanovic (PS). The so-called "Teplizky Commission" handed over to the parties of the Concertación on 8 January 1993 eight alternatives for the election, from which primary elections were held for previously registered militants and adherents of the coalition parties, in addition Of a convention that would be made up of 3,000 delegates, of which 60% would be elected in relation to the results of the primary, and 40% nominated by the commanders of Frei and Lagos, in proportion to the results obtained in the municipalities of 1992.

On May 20, Lagos and Frei starred in the only televised debate on the election, which was moderated by journalist Sergio Campos and scored 20 rating points.

The primaries were held on Sunday, May 23, 1993, with Eduardo Frei being the winner of the vote for 64% of the votes. The forcefulness of Frei's vote caused Lagos to quickly recognize his defeat, leaving the plain path to the primary and the definition of the candidacies of the Concertación for the parliamentary elections.

The Concertación convention was held at the Diego Portales Building, in Santiago, on May 30. Of the total members, 1924 went to Frei and 1076 to Lagos, being the first proclaimed presidential candidate of the Concertación.

Results

By region

Convention results

References 

1993 elections in Chile
Primary elections in Chile
Presidency of Patricio Aylwin